Kingsale may refer to:
Kinsale, a town in County Cork, Ireland
Baron Kingsale, a barony named after the town
Gene Kingsale (born 1976), Aruban-born former Major League Baseball player, now a professional baseball player in the Netherlands